Entodon is a genus of mosses belonging to the family Entodontaceae.

The genus has cosmopolitan distribution.

Species:
 Entodon abbreviatus Jaeger, 1878 
 Entodon abyssinicus (Müll.Hal.) A.Jaeger 
 Entodon concinnus Paris, 1904
 Entodon seductrix (Hedw.) Müll. Hal.

References

Hypnales
Moss genera